Listrocerum quentini is a species of beetle in the family Cerambycidae. It was described by Lepesme and Stephan von Breuning in 1956. It is known from the Ivory Coast.

References

Endemic fauna of Ivory Coast
Dorcaschematini
Beetles described in 1956